Dalyelliidae is a family of flatworms belonging to the order Rhabdocoela.

Genera

Genera:
 Alexlutheria Karling, 1956 
 Austrodalyellia Hochberg & Cannon, 2002 
 Axiola Luther, 1955 
 Castrella Fuhrmann, 1900 
 Dalyellia Gieysztor, 1938 
 Gieysztoria Ruebush & Hayes, 1939 
 Microdalyellia Gieysztor, 1938 
 Sergia Nasonov, 1923

References

Rhabdocoela
Platyhelminthes families